Germany women's national goalball team is the women's national team of Germany. Goalball is a team sport designed specifically for athletes with a vision impairment.  The team takes part in international goalball competitions.

Paralympic Games 

At the 1988 Summer Paralympics, the team finished fifth. The team competed at the 1992 Summer Paralympics in Barcelona, where they finished sixth. At the 1996 Summer Paralympics in Atlanta, Georgia, the team finished first. At the 2004 Summer Paralympics in Athens, Greece, the team finished sixth.

World Championships  

The 1986 World Championships were held in Roermond, the Netherlands. The team was one of ten teams participating, and they finished fifth overall. The 1990 World Championships were held in Calgary, Alberta, Canada.  The team was one of seven teams participating, and they finished fourth overall. The 1994 World Championships were held in Colorado Springs, Colorado.  The team was one of nine teams participating, and they finished second overall. The 1998 World Championships were held in Madrid, Spain.  The team was one of eleven teams participating, and they finished eighth overall. The 2002 World Championships were held in Rio de Janeiro, Brazil.  The team was one of ten teams participating, and they finished fourth overall.

IBSA World Games 

The 2007 IBSA World Championships and Games were held in Brazil.  The women's goalball competition included thirteen teams, including this one.  The competition was a 2008 Summer Paralympics qualifying event. Iva Fisher was third in the competition in scoring with 22 points.

Regional championships 

The team competes in the IBSA Europe goalball region.  

The 1985 European Championships were held in Olsztyn, Poland with six teams competing.  The team finished first. The 2001 European Championships were held in Neerpelt, Belgium with six teams competing.  The team finished fourth. In 2005, the European Championships were held in Neerpelt, Belgium.  With ten teams competing, the team finished first. The Turkish Blind Sports Federation hosted the 2007 IBSA Goalball European Championships in Anyalya, Turkey with 11 teams contesting the women's competition. The team finished fifth. Munich, Germany hosted the 2009 European Championships with eleven teams taking part.  The team finished the event in seventh place. The team competed at the 2013 European Championships in Turkey, where they finished fifth.

Goal scoring by competition

Competitive history 
The table below contains individual game results for the team in international matches and competitions.

References

Goalball women's
National women's goalball teams
Germany at the Paralympics
Goalball in Germany
European national goalball teams